Yengijeh (also Romanized as Yengījeh; also known as Yangija, Yantidzhe, Yengejeh, and Yenkejeh) is a village in Zanjanrud-e Bala Rural District, in the Central District of Zanjan County, Zanjan Province, Iran. At the 2006 census, its population was 1,116, in 310 families.

References 

Populated places in Zanjan County